The 1994 London Marathon was the 14th running of the annual marathon race in London, United Kingdom, which took place on Sunday, 17 April. The elite men's race was won by Mexico's Dionicio Cerón in a time of 2:08:53 hours and the women's race was won by Germany's Katrin Dörre-Heinig in 2:32:34. 

In the wheelchair races, Britain's David Holding (1:46:06) and Tanni Grey (2:08:26) won the men's and women's divisions, respectively.

Around 72,000 people applied to enter the race, of which 37,379 had their applications accepted and around 26,000 started the race. A total of 25,242 runners finished the race.

Results

Men

Women

Wheelchair men

Wheelchair women

References

Results
Results. Association of Road Racing Statisticians. Retrieved 2020-04-19.

External links

Official website

1994
London Marathon
Marathon
London Marathon